Vladimir Sandulović (Serbian Cyrillic: Владимир Сандуловић; born 18 May 1977) is a Serbian football manager and former player.

Playing career
A towering defender, Sandulović started his playing career with Timok, before transferring to OFK Beograd in the summer of 1998. He would go on to play professionally in Iceland (Stjarnan in 2000), Ukraine (Vorskla Poltava in 2005), Poland (Górnik Łęczna in 2006), Romania (Național București in 2007), and Sweden (Vasalunds IF in 2008), before moving back to his homeland. After spending one year at both Smederevo (2008–09) and Sevojno (2009–10), Sandulović returned to Timok to finish his journeyman career.

Managerial career
Following his retirement as a player in the summer of 2014, Sandulović was appointed manager of his former club Timok. He led the team to a fifth-place finish in the Serbian League East in his first season as a manager.

External links
 
 
 
 
 

FC Progresul București players
Association football defenders
Ekstraklasa players
Expatriate footballers in Iceland
Expatriate footballers in Poland
Expatriate footballers in Romania
Expatriate footballers in Sweden
Expatriate footballers in Ukraine
FC Vorskla Poltava players
First League of Serbia and Montenegro players
FK Sevojno players
FK Smederevo players
FK Timok managers
FK Timok players
FK Zemun players
Górnik Łęczna players
Liga I players
OFK Beograd players
People from Negotin
Serbia and Montenegro expatriate footballers
Serbian expatriate footballers
Serbian expatriate sportspeople in Iceland
Serbian expatriate sportspeople in Poland
Serbian expatriate sportspeople in Romania
Serbian expatriate sportspeople in Sweden
Serbia and Montenegro expatriate sportspeople in Ukraine
Serbian First League players
Serbian football managers
Serbia and Montenegro footballers
Serbian footballers
Stjarnan players
Ukrainian Premier League players
Úrvalsdeild karla (football) players
Vasalunds IF players
1977 births
Living people